Astrothelium amylosporum is a species of corticolous (bark-dwelling) lichen in the family Trypetheliaceae. Found in Bolivia, it was formally described as a new species in 2016 by lichenologists Adam Flakus and André Aptroot. It is somewhat similar to Astrothelium subdisjunctum, but differs from that species in its eight-spored asci and amyloid ascospores. The species epithet amylosporum refers to this latter characteristic.

References

amylosporum
Lichen species
Lichens described in 2016
Lichens of Bolivia
Taxa named by André Aptroot
Taxa named by Adam Grzegorz Flakus